Grundy County is a county located in the U.S. state of Iowa. At the 2020 census, the population was 12,329. The county seat is Grundy Center. The county is named for Felix Grundy, former U.S. Attorney General.

Grundy County is included in the Waterloo-Cedar Falls, IA Metropolitan Statistical Area.

History
Grundy County was formed on January 15, 1851, and became self-governing in 1856. It was named after Felix Grundy of Tennessee, a statesman, Senator, member of the House of Representatives and Attorney General under President James K. Polk.

The first courthouse was built in 1861. The wooden, two-story building contained a courtroom, but was used for other purposes, including housing the office of the sheriff, county treasurer, the judge, as well as a chamber for the jury.  The cornerstone for a second courthouse was laid on November 11, 1891.

Geography

Major highways
 U.S. Highway 20
 Iowa Highway 14
 Iowa Highway 57
 Iowa Highway 175

Adjacent counties
Butler County  (north)
Black Hawk County  (east)
Tama County  (southeast)
Marshall County  (southwest)
Hardin County  (west)
Franklin County (northwest)

Demographics

2020 census
There were 5,465 housing units, of which 5,069 were occupied.

2010 census
There were 5,530 housing units, of which 5,131 were occupied.

2000 census

At the 2000 census, there were 12,369 people, 4,984 households and 3,583 families residing in the county. There were 5,304 housing units at an average density of 11 per square mile (4/km2). The racial makeup of the county was 98.97% White, 0.08% Black or African American, 0.02% Native American, 0.29% Asian, 0.15% from other races, and 0.48% from two or more races. 0.58% of the population were Hispanic or Latino of any race.

There were 4,984 households, of which 30.70% had children under the age of 18 living with them, 63.80% were married couples living together, 5.50% had a female householder with no husband present, and 28.10% were non-families. 25.50% of all households were made up of individuals, and 14.20% had someone living alone who was 65 years of age or older. The average household size was 2.45 and the average family size was 2.94.

25.20% of the population were under the age of 18, 6.30% from 18 to 24, 25.10% from 25 to 44, 24.10% from 45 to 64, and 19.30% who were 65 years of age or older.  The median age was 41 years. For every 100 females, there were 95.70 males.  For every 100 females age 18 and over, there were 92.10 males.

The median household income was $39,396,] and the median family income was $46,627. Males had a median income of $32,006 and females $22,003. The per capita income was $19,142. About 3.30% of families and 4.60% of the population were below the poverty line, including 4.60% of those under age 18 and 5.70% of those age 65 or over.

Communities

Beaman
Conrad
Dike
Grundy Center
Holland
Morrison
Reinbeck
Stout
Wellsburg

Townships

Beaver Township
Black Hawk Township
Clay Township
Colfax Township
Fairfield Township
Felix Township
German Township
Grant Township
Lincoln Township
Melrose Township
Palermo Township
Pleasant Valley Township
Shiloh Township
Washington Township

Population ranking
The population ranking of the following table is based on the 2020 census of Grundy County.

† county seat

Politics

See also

National Register of Historic Places listings in Grundy County, Iowa

References

External links

Grundy County, Iowa Official website

 
1851 establishments in Iowa
Waterloo – Cedar Falls metropolitan area
Populated places established in 1851